Lee Adamson Miller (born 18 May 1983) is a Scottish football player and coach who last played as a striker for East Kilbride.

Miller played at club level for Falkirk (three spells), Bristol City, Hearts, Dundee United, Aberdeen, Middlesbrough, Notts County, Scunthorpe, Carlisle, Kilmarnock and Livingston; he represented Scotland in three international matches during the late 2000s.

Club career
Miller began his professional career with Falkirk, who were playing in the Scottish First Division at the time. He made his debut on 29 September 2001, in a 4–2 victory against Ross County. In March 2002, he was awarded the Scottish Football League Young Player of the Month award. At the end of the 2002–03 season, with Falkirk having won the First Division title, Miller was named as Scottish Football League Young Player of the Year. In July 2003, Aberdeen had a bid for Miller turned down. His agent then confirmed that he had handed in a transfer request.

His form with Falkirk attracted the attention of English side Bristol City, who paid £300,000 to secure his services in July 2003. Miller scored on his debut for Bristol City on 8 August 2003, as they beat Notts County 5–0. However, he failed to make a major impact and scored only eight goals in 42 games during the 2003–04 season. After playing in seven games with no goals during the 2004–05 season, Miller was transfer listed with an asking price of £50,000.

Miller went on loan to Scottish Premier League side Hearts in January 2005 and stayed with the Edinburgh club until the end of the season. He scored on his debut as Hearts beat Dundee United 3–2. He proved to be worth the £50,000 asking price, putting in several eye-catching performances for Hearts, scoring eight goals in 18 league appearances, including the opener in a memorable 2–0 away win over Celtic at Celtic Park. His form also won him the SPL Young Player of the Month award for February 2005. Hearts then attempted to secure Miller on a permanent deal, but his good form while on loan caused Bristol City to up their initial asking price.

In June 2005, Aberdeen and Hearts both had offers accepted by City, but Miller decided to join Dundee United for £225,000. As he had done at both Bristol City and Hearts, Miller scored on his debut for Dundee United in a 1–1 draw against Aberdeen.

At the start of the 2006–07 season, after refusing to play in a reserve match, United allowed Miller to join Aberdeen on a free transfer in August 2006. Miller was the subject of a police report in April 2007 after baring his backside in front of Dundee United supporters during a 4–2 defeat. Miller scored 13 goals in the 2007–08 season finishing as Aberdeen's top scorer and in May 2008, signed a two-year contract extension with the Pittodrie side. He scored his first goal of the season against Hearts at Pittodrie, and went on to score the only goal in a 1–0 win against Rangers. In March 2008, Miller was charged with driving dangerously at speeds of up to 120 mph. In September 2009, Miller was stripped of his licence, banned from driving for a year and fined £600. He was also ordered to sit an extended driving test before being allowed to regain his licence.

Miller was signed by Middlesbrough on 1 February 2010 for a fee of around £600,000. His time at Middlesbrough was short-lived however, as he only made 11 first-team league appearances for the club, scoring no goals. He spent most of the 2010–11 season out on loan. Firstly on 19 November 2010, he signed for Notts County on loan until 4 January 2011. On 28 January 2011, Miller joined Championship rivals Scunthorpe United in a loan deal until the end of the season. At Scunthorpe his only goal was the winner in a 3–2 win over Sheffield United.

On 23 August 2011, Miller signed a two-year contract with Carlisle United for an undisclosed fee. He scored two goals on his debut against Leyton Orient, which gave Carlisle a 2–1 victory. This was followed up with another goal in his first game at Brunton Park, a header against MK Dons. In January 2013 he was named Carlisle on the field captain. On 27 June 2013 Miller signed a new 12-month contract with Carlisle United, with the option of a further year. In May 2014 Miller, along with 10 other first team players, was released by Carlisle after the club's relegation to Football League Two.

Miller signed a two-year contract with Kilmarnock in July 2014. He made his debut on 26 August 2014, coming on as a substitute as Kilmarnock beat Ayrshire derby rivals Ayr United 1–0 in the Scottish League Cup. He scored his first goal for Kilmarnock on 14 March 2015, in a 1–0 win against St Mirren. At the end of the 2014–15 season, Miller was released by Kilmarnock.

On 17 August 2015, Miller signed for Falkirk for a second time, joining the club on a six-month contract. He was released by the club on 17 January 2018. One of his teammates during his return spell was Mark Kerr, with whom he had also played in his early years with the club (2000–03), as well as at Dundee United (2005–06) and Aberdeen (2008–10).

Two days after leaving Falkirk in January 2018, Miller signed for fellow Scottish Championship club Livingston. Miller left Livingston in November 2019 to take a coaching position at Falkirk.

Miller signed with East Kilbride as a player on 9 June 2021.

International career
Miller has three caps for Scotland, the first came in May 2006, during his time at Dundee United, against Japan in the 2006 Kirin Cup and the others whilst with Aberdeen. He came on as a substitute against Argentina in a friendly in November 2008.

In September 2009, he was due to join up with the Scotland squad for the World Cup Qualifier against the Netherlands, but a hamstring injury ruled him out. He started the friendly match on 10 October against Japan in Yokohama.

Coaching career
Miller left a playing contract with Livingston in November 2019 to take a coaching position with Falkirk, working with David McCracken. After a few games in interim charge of the team, McCracken and Miller were given control until the end of the 2019–20 season. Miller and McCracken were sacked by Falkirk in April 2021.

Personal life
Miller has four sons. As of 2021, the second oldest, Lennon, was playing for Motherwell's youth teams and for the Scotland under-16 side. Post football Miller attended the Scottish Barbering School where he retrained as a barber after the COVID-19 pandemic.

Career statistics

Club

Managerial statistics

initially caretaker. Made permanent on 13 December 2019.
 statistics includes the 3-0 forfeit win over Kilmarnock in the Scottish League Cup on Tuesday 6 October 2020.

Honours
Falkirk
Scottish Football League First Division: 2002–03

Scotland
Kirin Cup: 2006

Individual
Scottish Football League Young Player of the Month: March 2002
Scottish Football League Young Player of the Year: 2002–03
SPL Young Player of the Month: February 2005
SPL player of the month: December 2008

References

External links
 
Profile at AFC Heritage Trust

1983 births
Living people
Scottish footballers
Scotland international footballers
Scottish Premier League players
Scottish Football League players
English Football League players
Falkirk F.C. players
Bristol City F.C. players
Heart of Midlothian F.C. players
Dundee United F.C. players
Aberdeen F.C. players
Sportspeople from Lanark
Scotland B international footballers
Middlesbrough F.C. players
Notts County F.C. players
Carlisle United F.C. players
Footballers from South Lanarkshire
Kilmarnock F.C. players
Scottish Professional Football League players
Association football forwards
Livingston F.C. players
Falkirk F.C. non-playing staff
East Kilbride F.C. players